Pablo Pagis (born 29 December 2002) is a French professional footballer who plays as a striker for French  club Nîmes, on loan from Lorient.

Career
Pagis is a youth product of US Pont Péan, Rennes, Lorient and began his senior career with Lorient's reserves in 2020. On 24 December 2021, he signed his first professional contract with the club. On 31 August 2022, he joined Nîmes on a season long loan. He made his professional debut with Nîmes as a late substitute in a 3–2 Ligue 2 loss to Valenciennes on 2 September 2022.

Personal life
Pagis is the son of the French former footballer Mickaël Pagis.

References

External links
 
 

2002 births
Living people
Sportspeople from Montbéliard
French footballers
Association football forwards
FC Lorient players
Nîmes Olympique players
Ligue 2 players
Championnat National 2 players